The 24th New Brunswick Legislative Assembly represented New Brunswick between February 22, 1879, and May 25, 1882.

Edward Barron Chandler served as Lieutenant-Governor of New Brunswick until February 1880, when he was replaced by Robert Duncan Wilmot.

Benjamin Robert Stephenson was chosen as speaker.

The Conservative Party led by John James Fraser formed the government. Daniel L. Hanington replaced Fraser as leader in 1882.

History

Members 

Notes:

References 
The Canadian parliamentary companion and annual register, 1879, CH Mackintosh 

Terms of the New Brunswick Legislature
1879 establishments in New Brunswick
1882 disestablishments in New Brunswick